Perry Township is one of eleven townships in Clay County, Indiana. As of the 2010 census, its population was 934 and it contained 419 housing units.

History
The Aqueduct Bridge and Jeffers Bridge are listed on the National Register of Historic Places.

Geography

Unincorporated towns
 Art
 Cory
 Hickory Island
(This list is based on USGS data and may include former settlements.)

Adjacent townships
 Posey Township (north)
 Jackson Township (northeast)
 Sugar Ridge Township (east)
 Harrison Township (southeast)
 Lewis Township (south)
 Pierson Township, Vigo County (southwest)
 Riley Township, Vigo County (west)
 Lost Creek Township, Vigo County (northwest)

Major highways
  Indiana State Road 46

Cemeteries
The township contains three cemeteries: Mount Calvary, Stagg and Zion Gummere.

References
 United States Census Bureau cartographic boundary files
 U.S. Board on Geographic Names

External links

 Indiana Township Association
 United Township Association of Indiana

Townships in Clay County, Indiana
Terre Haute metropolitan area
Townships in Indiana